Chileuma is a genus of Chilean long-spinneret ground spiders that was first described by Norman I. Platnick, M. U. Shadab & L. N. Sorkin in 2005.  it contains only three species, found only in Chile: C. paposo, C. renca, and C. serena.

See also
 List of Prodidominae species

References

Araneomorphae genera
Gnaphosidae
Spiders of South America
Endemic fauna of Chile